Lists of governments of Lithuania includes two periods:

 List of governments of Lithuania since 1990
 List of governments of Lithuania (1918–40)